Rufus Crosby Kemper III is the current director of the U.S. National Institute of Museum and Library Services (IMLS). Previously director of the Kansas City Public Library from 2005 until 2020, Kemper's other experience includes CEO/Chairman of UMB Financial Corporation.

In 2005, Kemper co-founded the Show-Me Institute with Rex Sinquefield. He chaired the Missouri Commission on the Future of Higher Education and additionally served on various boards, including the Thomas Jefferson Foundation,  the Kansas City Symphony, the Black Archives of Mid-America, and acted as founding chairman of the Heart of America Shakespeare Festival. Under his leadership the Kansas City Public Library received the 2008 National Medal for Museum and Library Service, awarded to American libraries and museums with outstanding service to their communities.

Biography
The son of R. Crosby Kemper Jr. and Cynthia Warrick Kemper, he was born and raised in Kansas City, Missouri, then attended Andover, Eton College, and Yale University. His wife was the renowned historian and Yale University professor María Rosa Menocal.
He is married to Deborah Sandler, General Director and CEO of Lyric Opera of Kansas City.

Director of the IMLS
In November 2019, Kemper was nominated by President Donald Trump to serve as the director of the Institute of Museum and Library Services (IMLS), the primary source of federal support for US libraries and museums. The nomination was supported by the American Library Association, followed by a January 9, 2020, confirmation in the United States Senate for a term of four years.

Selected publications

References

Yale University alumni
Kemper family
People from the Kansas City metropolitan area
Year of birth missing (living people)
Living people